Carlos Gallardo may refer to:

 Carlos Gallardo (actor) (born 1966), Mexican actor and producer
Carlos Eduardo Gallardo (born 1984), Guatemalan footballer